Persipani (stands for Persatuan Sepakbola Indonesia Paniai) is an Indonesian football club based in Paniai Regency, Central Papua. The club play in Liga 3.

Honours
 Liga 3 Papua
 Champions: 2022

References

External links
Liga-Indonesia.co.id

Football clubs in Indonesia
Football clubs in Central Papua